Keshav Mangave (10 June 1926 – 11 July 1997) was an Indian wrestler. He competed in the men's freestyle featherweight at the 1952 Summer Olympics.

References

External links
 

1926 births
1997 deaths
People from Miraj
Indian male sport wrestlers
Olympic wrestlers of India
Wrestlers at the 1952 Summer Olympics
Place of birth missing
20th-century Indian people